Sergei Prokofiev wrote his Symphony No. 2 in D minor, Op. 40, in Paris in 1924-25, during what he called "nine months of frenzied toil".  He characterized this symphony as a work of "iron and steel".

Structure 
Prokofiev modeled the symphony's structure on Ludwig van Beethoven's last piano sonata (Op. 111): a tempestuous minor-key first movement followed by a set of variations. The first movement, in traditional sonata form, is rhythmically unrelenting, harmonically dissonant, and texturally thick. The second movement, twice as long as the first, comprises a set of variations on a plaintive, diatonic theme played on the oboe, which provides strong contrast to the defiant coda of the first movement. The subsequent variations contrast moments of beautiful meditation with cheeky playfulness, yet the tension of the first movement is never far away and contributes an ongoing sense of unease. The last variation integrates the theme with the violence of the first movement, reaching an inevitable climax. The symphony ends with a touching restatement of the initial oboe theme, eventually dispelled by an eerie chord on the strings.

Premiere and public reaction 
The piece was premiered in Paris on June 6, 1925, conducted by its dedicatee Serge Koussevitzky, and was not well received. After the premiere, Prokofiev commented that neither he nor the audience understood the piece. In a letter to Nikolai Myaskovsky, Prokofiev wrote:

I have made the music so complex to such an extent that when I listen to it myself I do not fathom its essence, so what can I ask of others?

Prokofiev later said that this symphony led him to have doubts about his ability as a composer for the first time in his life.

Prokofiev intended to reconstruct the piece in three movements, going so far as to assign the project the opus number 136, but the composer died before he could undertake the revisions. The symphony, little-known and rarely performed, remains among the least-played of Prokofiev's works .  Despite the negative criticism, the contemporary composer Christopher Rouse called it "the best of all of them" in regards to Prokofiev's work, and composed his own Symphony No. 3 in homage to the piece.

Instrumentation 
The work is scored for the following:

Woodwinds
Piccolo
2 Flutes
2 Oboes
Cor Anglais
2 Clarinets
Bass Clarinet
2 Bassoons
Contrabassoon
Brass
4 horns
3 Trumpets
3 Trombones
Tuba
Percussion
Timpani
Bass drum
Cymbals
Snare drum
Castanets
Triangle
Tambourine

Keyboard
Piano

Strings
Violins (1st and 2nd)
Violas
Cellos
Double Basses

Movements 

The symphony is in 2 movements, lasting 35–40 minutes:
 Allegro ben articolato (12 minutes)
 Theme and Variations (25 minutes)
 Theme: Andante
 Variation 1: L'istesso tempo
 Variation 2: Allegro non troppo
 Variation 3: Allegro
 Variation 4: Larghetto
 Variation 5: Allegro con brio
 Variation 6: Allegro moderato
 Theme

Recordings

Notes 

Symphonies by Sergei Prokofiev
1925 compositions
Compositions in D minor